Follistatin like 5 is a protein that in humans is encoded by the FSTL5 gene.

References

Further reading